The Mã Pí Lèng Pass is a mountain pass on the Highway 4C in the territory of Pai Lung and Pa Vi commune, Hà Giang province, North Vietnam.

It is at the altitude of 1,500 m (4,921 ft). The road was first built by Yao, H'mong, Tay and Lolo minority people.

This section of the Highway 4C was constructed in the years of 1960.

Etymology 
Mã Pí Lèng Pass is named after Mả Pí Lèng ban, a hamlet of Hmong people in Pai Lung commune. It is near also Mã Pí Lèng Peak.

The peak is named for its shape, "Mả Pí Lèng" (馬鼻樑) - meaning "bridge of a horse's nose". The word is from Hmong language.

References

Mountain passes of Vietnam
Landforms of Hà Giang province